Angelika Aleksandrovna Yutt (born 5 November 1969), better known by stage name Angelika, is a Russian opera, pop, house and trance singer, vocal trainer, producer and music composer. Her voice is a coloratura soprano.

Biography 
Angelika Yutt was born in Simferopol on 5 November 1969. She studied at a music school, then at the Simferopol music college.

1988-1989 – Crimean Ukrainian Drama and Musical Comedy theater, the soloist. The main repertory roles: Stasy in "Silva", Lisa in "Maritsa", Shurka in "Sladka Yagoda" ("The Sweet Berry").

1987 – participating in "Crimean Dawns" International Festival

1990-1991 – Moscow Philharmonic society, the soloist.

1992 – "The Charovnitsy" ("The Charmers" band), the soloist.

1993-1997 – The Republic of Belarus State Concert Orchestra conducting by Mikhail Finberg, the soloist 

In 1993 Angelika Yutt won "Maladzyechna-93" (Maladzyechna, 1993, the 1st prize) and "Vilnius-93" (Vilnius, 1993, diploma Holder, got "Belarusian Person of the Week" award by the "Zvezda" newspaper) international vocal competitions and participate in "Slavic Bazaar in Vitebsk" and "Belostotsky Mallows" (Poland) international festivals

1996 – the first solo album "The Coast Of Love" and the first video of the same name released.

1997-1999 – "Syabry" band, the soloist.

1996-1999 – "ANGELIKA" (gruppa "ANZHELIKA") band, the soloist

1998: publishing the second solo album "Planet of Love", as well as "Mama Maroussia" album and "The Charmed Paradise" book of videos.

In 1998 Angelika Yutt won "Belarusian hit parade-98" music videos festival, the category "The Best Songs Of The Year" 

Since 1999 Angelika has been working on "ANGELIKA" ("ANZHELIKA") solo project.

2002-2006: co-working with Igor Siliviorstov, a well-known Moscow producer ("Virus", "Strelki"). In this cooperation and under Igor's leadership "Above The Clouds" album, "I'm Flying" and "Goodbye" videos have appeared.

2005 – The Republic of Belarus State Concert Orchestra conducting by Mikhail Finberg, the soloist

Since 2006 "ANGELIKA" project has been working under the aegis of GlobalsounD Production.

2009 –  Millennium Opera label (Austria), which actually started the dream-mystery, a new musical trend as a mix of new age and new opera. This album was the first to use a combination of coloratura soprano with a club dance music in Trance, Progressive House, Ambient and Eurodance. The album included Mozart's "The 40th Symphony" and Tchaikovsky's "The Little Swans’ Dance" performed in vocal for the first time in the world. To date, Angelika Yutt is the only performer of vocal versions of these works.

The same year Russian sportsman, tenfold world champion in free callisthenics in rhythmic gymnastics Olga Kapranova won all major competitions of the year such as World and European Championships, World Cup stages, etc. with ANGELIKA's «Mozart’s Symphony No. 40 in dream-mystery» (exercises with ribbon).

2009 – to the present time: more than 15 Angelika's albums and singles were released, both solo and in co-working with musicians from Russia, France, Finland and USA. Her compositions repeatedly raised the first in JUNO, British sales charts, and were the part of TOP-100 best songs in Beatport, American music store.

2011 – “ANGELIKA’s The Best” (BVI Production/Sound Mystery) was released, included 7 artist's albums (90 tracks).

2012 – "Sing!" (TV project of STS channel, Russia), vocal coaching

Late 2013: Angelica Yutt became the first Russian artist who sang the Russian Federation National Anthem in Soul. The video of this interpretation of anthem summoned a violent reaction and discussions in social networks.

2014 – "Lugansk People Republic Hymn" (until 2016 was used as the official anthem), composing

2019 – The village of Volochanovo Hymn, composing and performing

Angelika Yutt is a poet, a songwriter, a composer, an author of a large number of works, the member of the Russian Authors ' Society (RAO) and the Russian Professional Writers’ Union.

Now she works as a vocal teacher and producer.

She is a supporter of the Russian invasion of Ukraine.

Filmography 
2012 – "The Lawyer" (TV serial), Galina the witness

Awards 
1993 – "Molodechno-93" vocal contest, the 1st prize

1993 – "Vilnius-93" international vocal competition, Diploma title.

1998 – "Belarusian hit parade’98", the 1st place in “The Best Songs Of The Year”

Charts 
 2013, June: I see you, DJ Clubactive feat – 2 in First Radio’ s Club Zone (Israel)
 2013, October:  Bad Love Story (The Stars) feat. VADIM XOROSH – 2 in Radius FM weekly chart (Republic of Belarus)
 2015, January 16: Egyptian Love – 3 in SONIDO GLOBAL «TOP 65» YEAR END 2014

References and notes

External links
 ANGELIKA's official site
 Angelika Yutt in The Eurodance Encyclopedia

1969 births
Living people
Russian women singers
Musicians from Simferopol
Anti-Ukrainian sentiment in Russia
Russian propagandists
Pro-Russian people of the 2014 pro-Russian unrest in Ukraine